Old Green is a census-designated place (CDP) in Adair County, Oklahoma, United States. The population was 315 at the 2010 census.

Geography
U.S. Route 62 runs east–west through the center of the community, and U.S. Route 59, running north–south, forms most of the eastern border.

Demographics

References

Census-designated places in Adair County, Oklahoma
Census-designated places in Oklahoma